FutureLearn is a British digital education platform founded in December 2012. The company is jointly owned by The Open University and SEEK Ltd. It is a Massive Open Online Course (MOOC), ExpertTrack, microcredential and degree learning platform. As of November included over 250 UK and international partners, including industry and government partners. In July 2022, accounts filed at Companies House reported that, in the opinion of the board, there was "material uncertainty" as to whether the company could continue as a going concern for the next 12 months.

History
FutureLearn was launched with 12 university partners, seeking those who "consistently rank at the top end of the…league tables". The 12 founding partners are: The Open University, University of Birmingham, University of Bristol, Cardiff University, University of East Anglia, University of Exeter, King's College London, Lancaster University, University of Leeds, University of Southampton, St Andrews University, and University of Warwick.

The launch was described as a move to 'fight back' and provide a space for UK institutions to engage in the MOOC space.

According to Financial Times, FutureLearn was the first platform to enable students to earn credits towards a degree from a top UK university from their tablets and smartphones, 2016.

In April 2019, FutureLearn announced that SEEK Ltd would invest £50 million in the company. In return, SEEK would receive a 50% stake in the company.

February 2020 saw the launch of microcredentials - courses that are 100-150 hours of learning and are accredited by leading universities, professional credentials designed for to build in-demand career skills. They are created alongside the Common Microcredential Framework which is an outcome from the EADTU Labour Market project funded by Erasmus+. 

January 2021 FutureLearn launched ExpertTracks - a series of courses that start as a 7 day free trial but lead into a rolling subscription, similar to Unlimited.

Courses
FutureLearn's courses span a broad range of topics. The first course opened on 14 October 2013. The first courses to be made available included "Web science: how the web is changing the world" (University of Southampton), "Introduction to ecosystems" (The Open University), "Improving your image: dental photography in practice" (University of Birmingham), "Causes of war" (King's College London), "The discovery of the Higgs boson" (University of Edinburgh), "Discover dentistry" (University of Sheffield), "Muslims in Britain: changes and challenges" (Cardiff University), "Begin programming: build your first mobile game" (University of Reading) and "England in the time of King Richard III" (University of Leicester). The first course to launch was "The secret power of brands", conducted by professor Robert Jones of the University of East Anglia.

Country restrictions 
In April 2017, FutureLearn blocked their courses for users in Crimea, Cuba, Iran, North Korea and Syria as a result of US sanctions on those territories. These restrictions were lifted in November 2017.

References

External links

Open University
College and university associations and consortia in the United Kingdom
British educational websites
Education companies established in 2012
2012 establishments in the United Kingdom